Janko is a surname and given name.

Janko may also refer to:

 Janko group, in mathematics
 Janko group J1
 Janko group J2
 Janko group J3
 Janko group J4
 Jankó keyboard
 Jankwa (or Janko), a Newar ritual

See also
 Janko Kráľ Park, a park in Bratislava's Petržalka borough